Apios carnea is a vine in the Fabaceae family found in Asia in a narrow band from the Himalayas of Nepal across Bhutan, India, Bangladesh, Myanmar,  China, Laos, and Vietnam.  Petioles are 5–8 cm long; compound leave typically have 5 leaflets. The flowers are found in long peduncled flexuous secund racemes 15–23 cm long. The reddish, flesh-colored flowers are showy and have potential as an ornamental. Pods are 10–13 cm long and contain 12 to 16 seeds.

References

Phaseoleae
Flora of Bangladesh
Flora of Bhutan
Flora of China
Flora of Laos
Flora of Myanmar
Flora of Vietnam
Taxa named by Nathaniel Wallich
Taxa named by George Bentham
Taxa named by John Gilbert Baker